Minikowo  is a village in the administrative district of Gmina Lubiewo, within Tuchola County, Kuyavian-Pomeranian Voivodeship, in north-central Poland.

The village has a population of 390.

References

Minikowo